Light-dependent reactions is jargon for certain photochemical reactions that are involved in photosynthesis, the main process by which plants acquire energy.  There are two light dependent reactions, the first occurs at photosystem II (PSII) and the second occurs at photosystem I (PSI),

PSII absorbs a photon to produce a so-called high energy electron which transfers via an electron transport chain to cytochrome bf and then to PSI. The then-reduced PSI, absorbs another photon producing a more highly reducing electron, which converts NADP to NADPH. In oxygenic photosynthesis, the first electron donor is water, creating oxygen (O2) as a by-product. In anoxygenic photosynthesis various electron donors are used.

Cytochrome b6f and ATP synthase work together to produce ATP (photophosphorylation) in two distinct ways. In non-cyclic photophosphorylation, cytochrome b6f uses electrons from PSII and energy from PSI to pump protons from the stroma to the lumen. The resulting proton gradient across the thylakoid membrane creates a proton-motive force, used by ATP synthase to form ATP. In cyclic photophosphorylation, cytochrome b6f uses electrons and energy from PSI to create more ATP and to stop the production of NADPH. Cyclic phosphorylation is important to create ATP and maintain NADPH in the right proportion for the light-independent reactions.

The net-reaction of all light-dependent reactions in oxygenic photosynthesis is:

2 + 2  + 3ADP + 3P →  + 2 H + 2NADPH + 3ATP

PSI and PSII are light-harvesting complexes. If a special pigment molecule in a photosynthetic reaction center absorbs a photon, an electron in this pigment attains the excited state and then is transferred to another molecule in the reaction center. This reaction, called photoinduced charge separation, is the start of the electron flow and transforms light energy into chemical forms.

Light dependent reactions

In chemistry, many reactions depend on the absorption of photons to provide the energy needed to overcome the activation energy barrier and hence can be labelled light-dependent. Such reactions range from the silver halide reactions used in photographic film to the creation and destruction of ozone in the upper atmosphere. This article discusses a specific subset of these, the series of light-dependent reactions related to photosynthesis in living organisms.

The reaction center

The reaction center is in the thylakoid membrane. It transfers absorbed light energy to a dimer of chlorophyll pigment molecules near the periplasmic (or thylakoid lumen) side of the membrane. This dimer is called a special pair because of its fundamental role in photosynthesis. This special pair is slightly different in PSI and PSII reaction centers. In PSII, it absorbs photons with a wavelength of 680 nm, and is therefore called P680. In PSI, it absorbs photons at 700 nm and is called P700. In bacteria, the special pair is called P760, P840, P870, or P960. "P" here means pigment, and the number following it is the wavelength of light absorbed.

Electrons in pigment molecules can exist at specific energy levels. Under normal circumstances, they are at the lowest possible energy level, the ground state. However, absorption of light of the right photon energy can lift them to a higher energy level. Any light that has too little or too much energy cannot be absorbed and is reflected. The electron in the higher energy level is unstable and will quickly return to its normal lower energy level. To do this, it must release the absorbed energy. This can happen in various ways. The extra energy can be converted into molecular motion and lost as heat, or re-emitted by the electron as light (fluorescence). The energy, but not the electron itself, may be passed onto another molecule; this is called resonance energy transfer. If an electron of the special pair in the reaction center becomes excited, it cannot transfer this energy to another pigment using resonance energy transfer. Under normal circumstances, the electron would return to the ground state, but because the reaction center is arranged so that a suitable electron acceptor is nearby, the excited electron is taken up by the acceptor. The loss of the electron gives the special pair a positive charge and, as an ionization process, further boosts its energy. The formation of a positive charge on the special pair and a negative charge on the acceptor is referred to as photoinduced charge separation. The electron can be transferred to another molecule. As the ionized pigment returns to the ground state, it takes up an electron and gives off energy to the oxygen evolving complex so it can split water into electrons, protons, and molecular oxygen (after receiving energy from the pigment four times). Plant pigments usually utilize the last two of these reactions to convert the sun's energy into their own.

This initial charge separation occurs in less than 10 picoseconds (10 seconds). In their high-energy states, the special pigment and the acceptor could undergo charge recombination; that is, the electron on the acceptor could move back to neutralize the positive charge on the special pair. Its return to the special pair would waste a valuable high-energy electron and simply convert the absorbed light energy into heat. In the case of PSII, this backflow of electrons can produce reactive oxygen species leading to photoinhibition. Three factors in the structure of the reaction center work together to suppress charge recombination nearly completely:
 Another electron acceptor is less than 1 nanometer away from the first acceptor, and so the electron is rapidly transferred farther away from the special pair.
 An electron donor is less than 1 nm away from the special pair, and so the positive charge is neutralized by the transfer of another electron.
 The electron transfer back from the electron acceptor to the positively charged special pair is especially slow. The rate of an electron transfer reaction increases with its thermodynamic favorability up to a point and then decreases. The back transfer is so favorable that it takes place in the inverted region where electron-transfer rates become slower.

Thus, electron transfer proceeds efficiently from the first electron acceptor to the next, creating an electron transport chain that ends when it has reached NADPH.

In chloroplasts

The photosynthesis process in chloroplasts begins when an electron of P680 of PSII attains a higher-energy level. This energy is used to reduce a chain of electron acceptors that have subsequently higher redox potentials. This chain of electron acceptors is known as an electron transport chain. When this chain reaches PSI, an electron is again excited, creating a high redox-potential. The electron transport chain of photosynthesis is often put in a diagram called the Z-scheme, because the redox diagram from P680 to P700 resembles the letter Z.

The final product of PSII is plastoquinol, a mobile electron carrier in the membrane. Plastoquinol transfers the electron from PSII to the proton pump, cytochrome b6f. The ultimate electron donor of PSII is water. Cytochrome b6f transfers the electron chain to PSI through plastocyanin molecules. PSI can continue the electron transfer in two different ways. It can transfer the electrons either to plastoquinol again, creating a cyclic electron flow, or to an enzyme called FNR (Ferredoxin—NADP(+) reductase), creating a non-cyclic electron flow. PSI releases FNR into the stroma, where it reduces  to NADPH.

Activities of the electron transport chain, especially from cytochrome b6f, lead to pumping of protons from the stroma to the lumen. The resulting transmembrane proton gradient is used to make ATP via ATP synthase.

The overall process of the photosynthetic electron transport chain in chloroplasts is:

Photosystem II

PSII is extremely complex, a highly organized transmembrane structure that contains a water splitting complex, chlorophylls and carotenoid pigments, a reaction center (P680), pheophytin (a pigment similar to chlorophyll), and two quinones. It uses the energy of sunlight to transfer electrons from water to a mobile electron carrier in the membrane called plastoquinone:

Plastoquinol, in turn, transfers electrons to cyt bf, which feeds them into PSI.

The water-splitting complex
The step  → P680 is performed by an imperfectly understood structure embedded within PSII called the water-splitting complex or oxygen-evolving complex (OEC). It catalyzes a reaction that splits water into electrons, protons and oxygen,

using energy from P680. The actual steps of the above reaction possibly occur in the following way (Kok's diagram of S-states):
(I) 2 (monoxide)  (II) OH.  (hydroxide) (III)  (peroxide) (IV) (super oxide)(V)  (di-oxygen).              (Dolai's mechanism)

The electrons are transferred to special chlorophyll molecules (embedded in PSII) that are promoted to a higher-energy state by the energy of photons.

The reaction center
The excitation P680 → P680 of the reaction center pigment P680 occurs here. These special chlorophyll molecules embedded in PSII absorb the energy of photons, with maximal absorption at 680 nm. Electrons within these molecules are promoted to a higher-energy state. This is one of two core processes in photosynthesis, and it occurs with astonishing efficiency (greater than 90%) because, in addition to direct excitation by light at 680 nm, the energy of light first harvested by antenna proteins at other wavelengths in the light-harvesting system is also transferred to these special chlorophyll molecules.

This is followed by the electron transfer P680→ pheophytin, and then on to plastoquinol, which occurs within the reaction center of PSII. The electrons are transferred to plastoquinone and two protons, generating plastoquinol, which released into the membrane as a mobile electron carrier. This is the second core process in photosynthesis. The initial stages occur within picoseconds, with an efficiency of 100%. The seemingly impossible efficiency is due to the precise positioning of molecules within the reaction center.  This is a solid-state process, not a typical chemical reaction. It occurs within an essentially crystalline environment created by the macromolecular structure of PSII. The usual rules of chemistry (which involve random collisions and random energy distributions) do not apply in solid-state environments.

Link of water-splitting complex and chlorophyll excitation
When the excited chlorophyll P passes the electron to pheophytin, it converts to high-energy P, which can oxidize the tyrosineZ (or YZ) molecule by ripping off one of its hydrogen atoms. The high-energy oxidized tyrosine gives off its energy and returns to the ground state by taking up a proton and removing an electron from the oxygen-evolving complex and ultimately from water. Kok's S-state diagram shows the reactions of water splitting in the oxygen-evolving complex.

Summary
PSII is a transmembrane structure found in all chloroplasts. It splits water into electrons, protons and molecular oxygen. The electrons are transferred to plastoquinol, which carries them to a proton pump. The oxygen is released into the atmosphere.

The emergence of such an incredibly complex structure, a macromolecule that converts the energy of sunlight into chemical energy and thus potentially useful work with efficiencies that are impossible in ordinary experience, seems almost magical at first glance. Thus, it is of considerable interest that, in essence, the same structure is found in purple bacteria.

Cytochrome bf
PSII and PSI are connected by a transmembrane proton pump, cytochrome bf complex (plastoquinol—plastocyanin reductase). Electrons from PSII are carried by plastoquinol to cyt bf, where they are removed in a stepwise fashion (re-forming plastoquinone) and transferred to a water-soluble electron carrier called plastocyanin. This redox process is coupled to the pumping of four protons across the membrane. The resulting proton gradient (together with the proton gradient produced by the water-splitting complex in PSI) is used to make ATP via ATP synthase.

The structure and function of cytochrome bf (in chloroplasts) is very similar to cytochrome bc1 (Complex III in mitochondria). Both are transmembrane structures that remove electrons from a mobile, lipid-soluble electron carrier (plastoquinone in chloroplasts; ubiquinone in mitochondria) and transfer them to a mobile, water-soluble electron carrier (plastocyanin in chloroplasts; cytochrome c in mitochondria). Both are proton pumps that produce a transmembrane proton gradient. In fact, cytochrome b6 and subunit IV are homologous to mitochondrial cytochrome b and the Rieske iron-sulfur proteins of the two complexes are homologous. However, cytochrome f and cytochrome c1 are not homologous.

Photosystem I

PSI accepts electrons from plastocyanin and transfers them either to NADPH (noncyclic electron transport) or back to cytochrome bf (cyclic electron transport):

                         plastocyanin → P700 → P700* → FNR → NADPH
                              ↑                ↓
                            bf        ←    phylloquinone

PSI, like PSII, is a complex, highly organized transmembrane structure that contains antenna chlorophylls, a reaction center (P700), phylloquinone, and a number of iron-sulfur proteins that serve as intermediate redox carriers.

The light-harvesting system of PSI uses multiple copies of the same transmembrane proteins used by PSII. The energy of absorbed light (in the form of delocalized, high-energy electrons) is funneled into the reaction center, where it excites special chlorophyll molecules (P700, with maximum light absorption at 700 nm) to a higher energy level. The process occurs with astonishingly high efficiency.

Electrons are removed from excited chlorophyll molecules and transferred through a series of intermediate carriers to ferredoxin, a water-soluble electron carrier. As in PSII, this is a solid-state process that operates with 100% efficiency.

There are two different pathways of electron transport in PSI. In noncyclic electron transport, ferredoxin carries the electron to the enzyme ferredoxin  reductase (FNR) that reduces  to NADPH. In cyclic electron transport, electrons from ferredoxin are transferred (via plastoquinol) to a proton pump, cytochrome bf. They are then returned (via plastocyanin) to P700. The ratio of NADPH to ATP production can be adjusted by adjusting the balance between cyclic and noncyclic electron transport.

It is noteworthy that PSI closely resembles photosynthetic structures found in green sulfur bacteria, just as PSII resembles structures found in purple bacteria.

In bacteria
PSII, PSI, and cytochrome b6f are found in chloroplasts. All plants and all photosynthetic algae contain chloroplasts, which produce NADPH and ATP by the mechanisms described above. In essence, the same transmembrane structures are also found in cyanobacteria.

Unlike plants and algae, cyanobacteria are prokaryotes. They do not contain chloroplasts; rather, they bear a striking resemblance to chloroplasts themselves. This suggests that organisms resembling cyanobacteria were the evolutionary precursors of chloroplasts. One imagines primitive eukaryotic cells taking up cyanobacteria as intracellular symbionts in a process known as endosymbiosis.

Cyanobacteria
Cyanobacteria contain both PSI and PSII. Their light-harvesting system is different from that found in plants (they use phycobilins, rather than chlorophylls, as antenna pigments), but their electron transport chain

           → PSII → plastoquinol → b6f → cytochrome c6 → PSI → ferredoxin  →  NADPH
                                                   ↑                     ↓
                                                  b6f       ←     plastoquinol

is, in essence, the same as the electron transport chain in chloroplasts.  The mobile water-soluble electron carrier is cytochrome c6 in cyanobacteria, having been replaced by plastocyanin in plants.

Cyanobacteria can also synthesize ATP by oxidative phosphorylation, in the manner of other bacteria.  The electron transport chain is

            NADH dehydrogenase → plastoquinol → b6f → cyt c6 → cyt aa3 → 

where the mobile electron carriers are plastoquinol and cytochrome c6, while the proton pumps are NADH dehydrogenase, cyt b6f and cytochrome aa3 (member of the COX3 family).

Cyanobacteria are the only bacteria that produce oxygen during photosynthesis. Earth's primordial atmosphere was anoxic. Organisms like cyanobacteria produced our present-day oxygen-containing atmosphere.

The other two major groups of photosynthetic bacteria, purple bacteria and green sulfur bacteria, contain only a single photosystem and do not produce oxygen.

Purple bacteria
Purple bacteria contain a single photosystem that is structurally related to PSII in cyanobacteria and chloroplasts:

 P870 → P870* → ubiquinone → cyt bc1 → cyt c2 → P870

This is a cyclic process in which electrons are removed from an excited chlorophyll molecule (bacteriochlorophyll; P870), passed through an electron transport chain to a proton pump (cytochrome bc1 complex; similar to the chloroplastic one), and then returned to the chlorophyll molecule. The result is a proton gradient that is used to make ATP via ATP synthase. As in cyanobacteria and chloroplasts, this is a solid-state process that depends on the precise orientation of various functional groups within a complex transmembrane macromolecular structure.

To make NADPH, purple bacteria use an external electron donor (hydrogen, hydrogen sulfide, sulfur, sulfite, or organic molecules such as succinate and lactate) to feed electrons into a reverse electron transport chain.

Green sulfur bacteria
Green sulfur bacteria contain a photosystem that is analogous to PSI in chloroplasts:

                             P840 → P840* → ferredoxin → NADH
                               ↑                ↓
                            cyt c553 ← bc1 ← menaquinol

There are two pathways of electron transfer. In cyclic electron transfer, electrons are removed from an excited chlorophyll molecule, passed through an electron transport chain to a proton pump, and then returned to the chlorophyll. The mobile electron carriers are, as usual, a lipid-soluble quinone and a water-soluble cytochrome. The resulting proton gradient is used to make ATP.

In noncyclic electron transfer, electrons are removed from an excited chlorophyll molecule and used to reduce NAD+ to NADH. The electrons removed from P840 must be replaced.

Purple bacteria and green sulfur bacteria occupy relatively minor ecological niches in the present day biosphere. They are of interest because of their importance in precambrian ecologies, and because their methods of photosynthesis were the likely evolutionary precursors of those in modern plants.

History
The first ideas about light being used in photosynthesis were proposed by Colin Flannery in 1779 who recognized it was sunlight falling on plants that was required, although Joseph Priestley had noted the production of oxygen without the association with light in 1772. Cornelis Van Niel proposed in 1931 that photosynthesis is a case of general mechanism where a photon of light is used to photo decompose a hydrogen donor and the hydrogen being used to reduce .
Then in 1939, Robin Hill demonstrated that isolated chloroplasts would make oxygen, but not fix , showing the light and dark reactions occurred in different places. Although they are referred to as light and dark reactions, both of them take place only in the presence of light. This led later to the discovery of photosystems I and II.

See also 
 Light-independent reaction
 Photosynthetic reaction centre
 Photosystem II
 Compensation point

References 

 
Photosynthesis